Saint-Pierre-le-Jeune Catholic Church is a late 19th-century Catholic church dedicated to Saint Peter in Strasbourg, France. It is not to be confused with the medieval Saint-Pierre-le-Jeune Protestant Church in the same city.

History 
Saint-Pierre-le-Jeune Catholic Church was built in the Neustadt district and stands next to the main courthouse Palais de Justice. Both buildings were designed by the architect Skjold Neckelmann; the church in collaboration with his professional partner August Hartel, and the courthouse, after Hartel's death, alone.

Before this Saint-Pierre-le-Jeune church was built, the Catholics and the Lutherans of Strasbourg had shared the medieval Saint-Pierre-le-Jeune church. Only in 1898 did the Catholics relinquish their claim to the older place.

Appearance 
Saint-Pierre-le-Jeune Catholic Church is built in rose sandstone. It is crowned with a heavy and imposing dome: interior diameter , interior height . The spacious interior of the church is decorated with altars, mosaics, and a very large circular chandelier. The current pipe organ was installed in 2003.

Gallery

References

External links
The parish
The pipe organ

Pierre
Strasbourg
Strasbourg
19th-century Roman Catholic church buildings in France